East Falls station is a station located along the Manayunk/Norristown Line in the East Falls section of Lower Northwest Philadelphia, Pennsylvania. It is located at Midvale Avenue & Cresson Street and includes a 51 space parking lot. In FY 2017, East Falls station had a weekday average of 835 boardings and 752 alightings.

Though little more than a pair of platforms with open shelters and a trailer, it serves as a replacement for a former Reading Railroad station which was opened in 1912, and burnt down approximately in 1982. It contains a staircase leading to Cresson Street and the station on the north side of the viaduct over Midvale Avenue, and a pedestrian crosswalk with a traffic signal exclusively for that crosswalk on the south side.

Station layout

References

External links
SEPTA – East Falls Station
 Midvale Avenue entrance from Google Maps Street View
 Station from Google Maps Street View

SEPTA Regional Rail stations
Former Reading Company stations
East Falls, Philadelphia
Railway stations in the United States opened in 1856